Olga Yuryevna Ismayilova (née Panarina; born 16 September 1985) is a Belarusian-Azerbaijani track cyclist, specialising in the sprint disciplines. Originally representing Belarus, she won two bronze medals at the 2010 UCI Track Cycling World Championships: in the 500 m time trial and the keirin, having finished fourth in the sprint in 2009. She has represented Azerbaijan since 2016. She notably competed for Azerbaijan at the 2016 Summer Olympics.

Palmarès 

2014
GP Sprint of South Moravia
1st Keirin
1st Sprint
International Track Women & Men
1st Sprint
2nd Keirin
Panevezys
1st Keirin
1st Sprint
2nd Sprint, Fenioux Piste International 
2nd 500m Time Trial, Fenioux Trophy Piste
2015
Fenioux Piste International
1st Keirin
1st Sprint
Trofeu CAR Anadia Portugal
1st Sprint
1st 500m Time Trial
Panevezys
1st 500m Time Trial
2nd Sprint
Grand Prix Minsk
1st 500m Time Trial
3rd Keirin

External links 

1985 births
Living people
Belarusian female cyclists
Azerbaijani female cyclists
Place of birth missing (living people)
UCI Track Cycling World Champions (women)
Cyclists at the 2012 Summer Olympics
Cyclists at the 2016 Summer Olympics
Olympic cyclists of Belarus
Olympic cyclists of Azerbaijan
Belarusian emigrants to Azerbaijan
Naturalized citizens of Azerbaijan
Belarusian track cyclists